Joker is an Iranian Reality show by Filimo. Ehsan Alikhani and Hamed Mirfatahi directed it in 2021, produced by Amir Hossein Bozorgzadegan and Mohsen Najafi. Several famous Iranian celebrities have to make laugh each other, but themselves should not laugh.

The Joker series is an unlicensed adaptation of the Japanese series Documental, which was adapted in other countries officially as Last One Laughing.

Plot 
The Joker Competition, has a moderator and presenter or host.  In each season, the 8 artists have 6 hours to laugh at each other in a house equipped with all the facilities, with different programs, and remove them from the game, without laughing themselves.

The general space of the room where the participants are present and where the competition is held, has a design similar to the home space and has a living room and a kitchen.  There is also an accessory and makeup room next to the participants' room.  Participants go to this room whenever they want during the game and bring a tool from there or make a change in their appearance so that they can make others laugh with it.

The program has a host who also acts as the referee of the match.  He has a separate room with a space similar to a monitoring room, where he sits during the race and monitors the participants.  Whenever the host sees one of the participants laughing from their room monitors, he stops the game with the red button in front of him.  He then goes to the playroom and fines the offending participant by showing a slow laughter scene.  After that, he returns to his room and announces the continuation of the match with the green button.

Terms and conditions 
The Joker is a comedy contest in which eight participants are locked up in a large room for a period of time.  The participants of this competition are famous artists.  Everyone should laugh at others during the match and not laugh at the same time.  Each participant who laughs receives a yellow card the first time and is fined a second time with a red card and expelled from the room.

Each participant also has a special opportunity of laughing on a limited time as Joker Time that he can use whenever he wants.  In this opportunity, others must pay full attention to him and are not allowed to do anything else, and during this time, the person performs a special performance to make others laugh.

Participants use different methods to make others laugh and perform different types of comedy.  These include: comedy performances, characterization and typography, verbal jokes, comic music performances, stand-up comedy performances, the use of various accessories and tools such as dolls and funny costumes, parodying famous works, physical comedy, and so on.

Also, from time to time, a guest enters the contest to be able to make the participants laugh by performing stand-up comedy, telling jokes, playing a game, and so on.

Each participant who receives a red card and is eliminated from the competition, comes to the host room and watches the continuation of the competition with him.  The host can also, at his own discretion, return the deleted participant as Zombie to the room for a certain period of time to make others laugh.  With the elimination of the participants, the last person to stay in the room wins the contest and wins the statuette and the grand prize.  It will also advance to the finalists section.

Seasons

Season 1 
Zombie Performer: Ali Lakpourian
Guest Appearance: Iraj Maleki

Participants 
 Sam Derakhshani
 Bijan Banafshekhah
 Amir Kazemi
 Gholamreza Nikkhah
 Soheil Mostajabian
 Hooman Haji Abdollahi
 Amin Hayai
 Amir Mahdi Jule

Elimination table 
  W   The competitor wins the game
  S   The competitor has not undergone any action and is still safe
  A   The competitor is warned but continues the game
  E   The competitor is expelled and exits the game
  EE   The competitor is warned and expelled in the same episode 
  Z   The competitor is chosen to return to the room as a 'Zombie' to make other participants laugh
  -   Already expelled in a previous episode

Season 2 
''Zombie Performer: Ali LakpourianGuest Appearance: Majid Shapouri

 Participants 
 Iman Safa
 Vahid Aghapour
 Hooman Barghnavard
 Shahram Ghaedi
 Abbas Jamshidifar
 Sepand Amirsoleimiani
 Arash Nowzari
 Behnam Tashakkor

 Elimination table 
  W   The competitor wins the game
  S   The competitor has not undergone any action and is still safe
  A   The competitor is warned but continues the game
  E   The competitor is expelled and exits the game
  EE   The competitor is warned and expelled in the same episode 
  Z   The competitor is chosen to return to the room as a 'Zombie' to make other participants laugh
  -   Already expelled in a previous episode

 Season 3 Zombie'' Performer: Ali Lakpourian
Guest Appearance: Manouchehr Azari

Participants 
 Hamid Lolayi
 Soroush Jamshidi
 Alireza Ostadi
 Mirtaher Mazloumi
 Siavash Cheraghipour
 Babak Nahrain
 Reza Shafiei Jam
 Amir Ghaffarmanesh

Elimination table 
  W   The competitor wins the game
  S   The competitor has not undergone any action and is still safe
  A   The competitor is warned but continues the game
  E   The competitor is expelled and exits the game
  EE   The competitor is warned and expelled in the same episode 
  Z   The competitor is chosen to return to the room as a 'Zombie' to make other participants laugh
  -   Already expelled in a previous episode

Record of watching 
The second episode of the Joker, with 18 million 410 thousand 491 minutes of viewing in 16 hours, set a record for watching a series in Filimo.

Overview

Songs 
Sina Hejazi has sung a track for "Joker", which will be played as the ending theme of this series.

See also
 LOL
 List of Amazon Prime Video original programming

Notes

References

External links 
 

2020s Iranian television series
Iranian television series